How to Blow Up a Pipeline is a 2022 heist film directed by Daniel Goldhaber and written by Ariela Barer, Jordan Sjol and Goldhaber. It is an adaptation of Andreas Malm's 2021 book of the same name, published by Verso Books.  It stars Ariela Barer, Kristine Froseth, Lukas Gage, Forrest Goodluck, Sasha Lane, Jayme Lawson, Marcus Scribner, Jake Weary and Irene Bedard.

Malm's book is a work of nonfiction that uses a history of social justice movements to argue that property destruction should be considered a valid tactic in the pursuit of environmental justice. The film, set primarily in West Texas, revolves around a group of eight young people who decide to blow up an oil pipeline. It is scheduled to be released in the United States on April 7, 2023.

Premise
A group of environmental activists try to prevent the development of a pipeline by resorting to sabotage.

Cast
Ariela Barer as Xochitl
Kristine Froseth as Rowan
Lukas Gage as Logan
Forrest Goodluck as Michael
Sasha Lane as Theo
Jayme Lawson as Alisha
Marcus Scribner as Shawn
Jake Weary as Dwayne
Irene Bedard as Joanna

Release
The film premiered in the Platform Prize program at the 2022 Toronto International Film Festival on September 10, 2022. After its premiere, NEON acquired the North American distribution rights, intending to release it theatrically. It is scheduled to be released in the United States on April 7, 2023.

Reception 
On the review aggregator website Rotten Tomatoes, the film has an approval rating of 100%, based on 21 critic reviews with an average rating of 8.2/10. Metacritic, which uses a weighted average, assigned a score of 86 out of 100, based on four reviews indicating "universal acclaim".

References

External links 
 

2022 films
2022 action drama films
American action drama films
American independent films
American political films
Procedural films
2020s American films
American heist films
Climate change films
Eco-terrorism in fiction